Salesforce Tower Atlanta is a 425 ft (130m) tall skyscraper in Atlanta, Georgia. It was completed in 1986 and has 34 floors. Smallwood, Reynolds, Stewart, Stewart & Associates, Inc. designed the building, which is tied with 1100 Peachtree as the 25th tallest building in Atlanta. A second tower with the same profile, but boasting ten additional floors, and a four-hundred-room hotel were originally planned for the surrounding site but never built.

The building entry is undergoing renovations. Renovations are to begin August 1, 2017.

On October 17, 2018 Salesforce.com announced plans to occupy 3 additional floors. This will bring their total occupancy to 7 floors thus earning Salesforce naming rights to the tower.

Other office occupants include RentPath, Rubicon, SAS Institute, Ademco, Soltech, iFOLIO, and Carat.

History 
Construction began in March 1984. The building was constructed as a joint venture by Vantage Properties of Dallas and Travelers Insurance. In 1988, Sumitomo Life Realty acquired the building. In 1999, the building was purchased from Sumitomo Life Realty by a public pension fund.

See also
List of tallest buildings in Atlanta

References

Emporis
Skyscraperpage

Skyscraper office buildings in Atlanta
Office buildings completed in 1986
Salesforce